Esther Shiner (February 12, 1924 – December 19, 1987) was a municipal politician in Toronto, Ontario, Canada.  She served on the North York city council from 1973 until her death, and was also a member of the Metropolitan Toronto council.  She served as North York's Deputy Mayor in the 1980s.

Early life and career

Shiner's parents were Jewish refugees from Poland. She was raised in modest circumstances, and attended the University of Toronto for a year before marrying and becoming a homemaker. Shiner was an active Zionist, and was a member of Hadassah in her youth.

Municipal politician

Shiner was elected as an alderman for North York's fourth ward in the 1972 municipal election. Her primary cause was the Spadina Expressway, which she wanted to extend as far as downtown Toronto.  Shiner fought several battles with Premier Bill Davis on this issue, and unsuccessfully tried to have a city-wide plebiscite on extension in 1985. The expressway was partly extended in the 1970s, but Davis blocked any further extensions.

Shiner was elected to the North York Board of Control in 1976, and remained a member until her death.  The position gave her an automatic seat on the Metropolitan Toronto Council. She served on Metro's transportation committee for several years, and was a frequent rival to fellow councillor Anne Johnston.  She was also appointed to the management board of the O'Keefe Centre for the Performing Arts in 1979, and remained a board member until 1986.  Shiner supported the principle of amalgamation for Toronto's six municipal governments in 1978, on the grounds that it would yield a better transportation system.

In 1982, she helped convince North York City Council to name a street after Swedish diplomat Raoul Wallenburg, who is credited with saving the lives of over 100,000 Hungarian Jews in World War II.

Shiner held conservative views on several issues.  She opposed councillor Howard Moscoe's plan for campaign donation limits in 1984, arguing that it would be unworkable.  She also criticized an affirmative action plan for North York employees, and suggested that a housing task force for the city could become an expensive waste of time.  Shiner considered challenging Mel Lastman for Mayor of North York in 1985, but declined.

She died in December 1987, at age 63.  The North York City Council held a moment of silence in her honour in January 1988, and the civic square carillons played "Moon River" and "Somewhere Over The Rainbow", two of her favourite songs.  She was interred at Pardes Shalom Cemetery in Maple, Ontario. Later in the year, the North York Civic Stadium in the Bathurst and Finch area was renamed the Esther Shiner Stadium.  Her son, David Shiner, was a municipal politician in Toronto prior to the 2018 Toronto municipal election. A street in the Sheppard Avenue and Leslie Street area is named 'Esther Shiner Blvd.' in her honour.

Sources

"Esther Shiner: North York politician earned wide respect" (obituary notice), The Globe and Mail, 21 December 1987, A19.

Electoral record

Results taken from The Globe and Mail, 14 November 1985.  The final results were not significantly different.
Electors could vote for four candidates.  The percentages are determined in relation to the total number of votes.

Results taken from The Globe and Mail, 9 November 1982.
The final results confirmed the election of Shiner, Greene, Yuill and Sutherland.
Electors could vote for four candidates.  The percentages are determined in relation to the total number of votes.

Results taken from the Toronto Star, 11 November 1980.
The final results confirmed the election of Shiner, Yuill, Sutherland and Gardner.
Electors could vote for four candidates.  The percentages are determined in relation to the total number of votes.

Results taken from the Toronto Star, 14 November 1978.  
The final results confirmed the election of Greene, Shiner, Yuill and Paisley.
Electors could vote for four candidates.  The percentages are determined in relation to the total number of votes.

Results taken from the Toronto Star, 6 December 1976.
The final results confirmed the election of Greene, Shiner, Summers and Yuill.
Electors could vote for four candidates.  The percentages are determined in relation to the total number of votes.

Results taken from the Toronto Star, 3 December 1974.
 The final official results were not significantly different.

Results taken from the Toronto Star, 5 December 1972.
  These results obviously do not reflect the final totals.  Shiner pulled ahead of Perry when the final eighteen polls were counted, and was listed in the next day's Star as winning by twelve votes, 2,326 to 2,314.

References

External Resources

1924 births
1987 deaths
Jewish Canadian politicians
Women municipal councillors in Canada
Women in Ontario politics
Metropolitan Toronto councillors
People from North York
20th-century Canadian women politicians
Jewish women politicians